Airman is a person serving in an air force or other military aviation service..

Airman may also refer to:

For civilian and generic usage, see Aviator
Airman Magazine, the official magazine of the U.S. Air Force
Airman (comics), a superhero from Centaur Publications
Airman (novel), a 2008 novel by Eoin Colfer
Airman, alternate name of Irman, a village in Iran
ST Airman, a tugboat